William Brown (10 May 1897–unknown) was a Scottish footballer who played in the Football League for Everton and Nottingham Forest.

References

1897 births
Scottish footballers
Association football midfielders
English Football League players
Cambuslang Rangers F.C. players
Partick Thistle F.C. players
Everton F.C. players
Nottingham Forest F.C. players
Prescot Cables F.C. players
Year of death missing